In articulatory phonetics, a consonant is a speech sound that is articulated with complete or partial closure of the vocal tract. Contrasting with consonants are vowels.

Since the number of speech sounds in the world's languages is much greater than the number of letters in any one alphabet, linguists have devised systems such as the International Phonetic Alphabet (IPA) to assign a unique and unambiguous symbol to each attested consonant. For example, the sound spelled  in "this" is a different consonant from the  sound in "thin".

Etymology
The word consonant comes from Latin oblique stem , from  'sounding-together', a calque of Greek   (plural).

Dionysius Thrax calls consonants  ( 'sounded with') because in Greek they can only be pronounced with a vowel.

This description does not apply to some languages, such as the Salishan languages, in which plosives may occur without vowels (see Nuxalk), and the modern concept of 'consonant' does not require co-occurrence with a vowel.

Consonant sounds and consonant letters

The word consonant may be used ambiguously for both speech sounds and the letters of the alphabet used to write them. In English, these letters are B, C, D, F, G, J, K, L, M, N, P, Q, S, T, V, X, Z and often H, R, W, Y.

In English orthography, the letters H, R, W, Y and the digraph GH are used for both consonants and vowels. For instance, the letter Y stands for the consonant/semi-vowel  in yoke, the vowel  in myth, the vowel  in funny, the diphthong  in sky, and forms several digraphs for other diphthongs, such as say, boy, key. Similarly, R commonly indicates or modifies a vowel in non-rhotic accents.

This article is concerned with consonant sounds, however they are written.

Consonants versus vowels

Consonants and vowels correspond to distinct parts of a syllable: The most sonorous part of the syllable (that is, the part that's easiest to sing), called the syllabic peak or nucleus, is typically a vowel, while the less sonorous margins (called the onset and coda) are typically consonants. Such syllables may be abbreviated CV, V, and CVC, where C stands for consonant and V stands for vowel. This can be argued to be the only pattern found in most of the world's languages, and perhaps the primary pattern in all of them. However, the distinction between consonant and vowel is not always clear cut: there are syllabic consonants and non-syllabic vowels in many of the world's languages.

One blurry area is in segments variously called semivowels, semiconsonants, or glides. On one side, there are vowel-like segments that are not in themselves syllabic, but form diphthongs as part of the syllable nucleus, as the i in English boil . On the other, there are approximants that behave like consonants in forming onsets, but are articulated very much like vowels, as the y in English yes . Some phonologists model these as both being the underlying vowel , so that the English word bit would phonemically be , beet would be , and yield would be phonemically . Likewise, foot would be , food would be , wood would be , and wooed would be .

The other problematic area is that of syllabic consonants, segments articulated as consonants but occupying the nucleus of a syllable.

Other languages use fricative and often trilled segments as syllabic nuclei, as in Czech and several languages in Democratic Republic of the Congo, and China, including Mandarin Chinese. Ladefoged and Maddieson call these "fricative vowels" and say that "they can usually be thought of as syllabic fricatives that are allophones of vowels". That is, phonetically they are consonants, but phonemically they behave as vowels.

Many Slavic languages allow the trill  and the lateral  as syllabic nuclei (see Words without vowels). In languages like Nuxalk, it is difficult to know what the nucleus of a syllable is, or if all syllables even have nuclei. If the concept of 'syllable' applies in Nuxalk, there are syllabic consonants in words like  (?) 'seal fat'. Miyako in Japan is similar, with  'to build' and  'to pull'.

Each spoken consonant can be distinguished by several phonetic features:

 The manner of articulation is how air escapes from the vocal tract when the consonant or approximant (vowel-like) sound is made. Manners include stops, fricatives, and nasals.

 The place of articulation is where in the vocal tract the obstruction of the consonant occurs, and which speech organs are involved. Places include bilabial (both lips), alveolar (tongue against the gum ridge), and velar (tongue against soft palate). In addition, there may be a simultaneous narrowing at another place of articulation, such as palatalisation or pharyngealisation. Consonants with two simultaneous places of articulation are said to be coarticulated.

 The phonation of a consonant is how the vocal cords vibrate during the articulation. When the vocal cords vibrate fully, the consonant is called voiced; when they do not vibrate at all, it is voiceless.

 The voice onset time (VOT) indicates the timing of the phonation. Aspiration is a feature of VOT. 

 The airstream mechanism is how the air moving through the vocal tract is powered. Most languages have exclusively pulmonic egressive consonants, which use the lungs and diaphragm, but ejectives, clicks, and implosives use different mechanisms. 

 The length is how long the obstruction of a consonant lasts. This feature is borderline distinctive in English, as in "wholly"  vs. "holy" , but cases are limited to morpheme boundaries. Unrelated roots are differentiated in various languages such as Italian, Japanese, and Finnish, with two length levels, "single" and "geminate". Estonian and some Sami languages have three phonemic lengths: short, geminate, and long geminate, although the distinction between the geminate and overlong geminate includes suprasegmental features.

 The articulatory force is how much muscular energy is involved. This has been proposed many times, but no distinction relying exclusively on force has ever been demonstrated.

All English consonants can be classified by a combination of these features, such as "voiceless alveolar stop" . In this case, the airstream mechanism is omitted.

Some pairs of consonants like p::b, t::d are sometimes called fortis and lenis, but this is a phonological rather than phonetic distinction.

Consonants are scheduled by their features in a number of IPA charts:

Examples
The recently extinct Ubykh language had only 2 or 3 vowels but 84 consonants; the Taa language has 87 consonants under one analysis, 164 under another, plus some 30 vowels and tone. The types of consonants used in various languages are by no means universal. Most languages, however, do include one or more fricatives, with  being the most common, and a liquid consonant or two, with  the most common. The approximant  is also widespread, and virtually all languages have one or more nasals, though a very few, such as the Central dialect of Rotokas, lack even these. This last language has the smallest number of consonants in the world, with just six.

Most common
( is less common in non-rhotic accents.)

However, even these common five are not completely universal. Several languages in the vicinity of the Sahara Desert, including Arabic, lack . A few languages on Bougainville Island and around Puget Sound, such as Makah, lack both of the nasals  and  altogether, except in special speech registers such as baby-talk. Despite the 80-odd consonants of Ubykh, it lacks the plain velar  in native words, as do the related Adyghe and Kabardian languages. But with a few striking exceptions, such as Xavante and Tahitian—which have no dorsal consonants whatsoever—nearly all other languages have at least one velar consonant: most of the few languages that do not have a simple  (that is, a sound that is generally pronounced ) have a consonant that is very similar.

Audio samples
The following pages include consonant charts with links to audio samples.

 IPA pulmonic consonant chart with audio
 IPA non-pulmonic consonant chart with audio
 Ejective consonant
 Click consonant
 Implosive consonant

See also
Articulatory phonetics
List of consonants
List of phonetics topics
Words without vowels

Notes

References

Sources
Ian Maddieson, Patterns of Sounds, Cambridge University Press, 1984.

External links

Interactive manner and place of articulation
Consonants (Journal of West African Languages)